The following is a list of attractions that previously existed at the Warner Bros. Movie World amusement park on the Gold Coast, Queensland, Australia.

Attractions

Shows

References

Former Warner Bros. Movie World attractions
Lists of former amusement park attractions